The following radio stations broadcast on FM frequency 95.0 MHz:

Bahrain
 95.0FM Traditional FM in Bahrain

Cambodia
 95.0 Bayon FM, sister radio channel for Bayon Television

China 
 CNR The Voice of China in Changsha (during 05:00-01:00 next day), Hengyang, Shuangfeng, Xiangtan, and Zhuzhou

Cyprus
 Sport 95 FM in Frederick University 
 Radio Amore FM, in Limassol

India
 FM Tadka 95 FM in Jaipur, Rajasthan
 Hit 95FM in New Delhi NCR
 Radio Mirchi (alternative frequency) in Bengaluru, Karnataka
 Radio One (alternative frequency) in Hyderabad, Telangana

Ireland
 Limerick's Live 95FM

Laos
 Lao National Radio

Malta
 Bastjaniżi FM in Qormi

New Zealand
 95 BOP FM in Tauranga
 90-3 More FM Kapiti/Horowhenua, formerly "Horowhenua's 95FM", in Horowhenua
 Port FM in Fairlie
 Fresh FM in Takaka
 Tahu FM in Dundedin

Romania
 Virgin Radio Romania in Pitești

Russia
 NRJ Russia (alternative frequency) in St. Petersburg
 Radio MIR, in Novosibirsk

Singapore
 Class 95

Turkey
 TRT FM in Bursa
 TRT Radyo Haber in Ankara
 Acik Radyo in Istanbul

United Kingdom
 BBC Radio Gloucestershire 95 FM in Stroud
 Celtic Music Radio in Glasgow, Scotland
 BBC Radio Shropshire in Ludlow, England

Vietnam
 95.0 FM in Ninh Thuận

Zimbabwe
 Khulumani FM in Bulawayo

Other 95 FMs
These radio stations have used the moniker "95FM" even though their actual radio frequencies are not 95.0 MHz:
 KBVB, "Bob 95 FM", in Barnesville, Minnesota, US
 KICT-FM, "T-95FM", in Wichita, Kansas, US
 WOBR-FM, "Beach 95FM", in Wanchese, North Carolina, US
 WQHY, "Q95FM", in Prestonsburg, Kentucky, US
 "Q95 FM", in Dominica
 WFGI-FM, "Froggy 95FM", in Johnstown, Pennsylvania, US
 WWRM, "95FM", in Tampa, Florida, US
 WXIL, "My 95 FM", in Elizabeth, West Virginia, US
 951 Remix, in Trinidad and Tobago

References

Lists of radio stations by frequency